Bernice Frederic Sisk  (December 14, 1910 – October 25, 1995) was an American politician who served as a Congressman from California from 1955 to 1979.  He was a Democrat.

Life and career
Sisk was born in 1910 in Montague, Texas, the son of Lavina (Thomas) and Arthur Lee Sisk. He was elected to the House in 1954, representing a district that included Fresno, Merced and Modesto.  He defeated Republican incumbent Allan Hunter in one of the major upsets of the 1954 midterm Congressional elections.  The district had been in Republican hands for all but ten years since its creation in 1913, but Sisk went on to hold the seat for 12 terms. The district would remain in Democratic hands until the election of Republican John Duarte to Congress in 2022.

He was a long-time member of the House Rules Committee and the Agriculture Committee, and served as Chairman of the Cotton Subcommittee, where he helped heal the long-standing rift between southern and western cotton producers.  A proponent of production inducements rather than direct farm subsidies, he backed legislation to aid the dairy, wine, sugar, fig and raisin industries.  Sisk was also a major political force in the United States Congress for the creation of the Central Valley Project that eventually developed into a $37 billion water system that continues to serve California's 400-mile-long Central Valley.

Sisk retired from Congress in 1978. He was succeeded by his former chief of staff, Tony Coelho.

B. F. Sisk was a member of the Palm Avenue Church of Christ in Fresno.

Electoral history 

|+ California's 12th congressional district: Results 1954-1960
! Year
!
! Subject
! Party
! Votes
! %
!
! Opponent
! Party
! Votes
! %
|-

|1954
||
| |B. F. Sisk
| |Democratic
| |63,911
| |53.79
||
| | A. Oakley Hunter (inc.)
| |Republican
| |54,903
| |46.21
|-
|1956
||
| |B. F. Sisk (inc.)
| |Democratic
| |69,300
| |73.00
||
| |Robert B. Moore	
| |Republican
| |40,663
| |27.00
|-
|1958
||
| |B. F. Sisk (inc.)
| |Democratic
| |112,702
| |81.12
||
| |Daniel K. Halpin	
| |Republican
| |26,228
| |18.88
|-
|1960
||
| |B. F. Sisk (inc.)
| |Democratic
| |141,974
| |99.91
||
| |Others (write-in)
| |N/A
| |126
| |0.09

|+ California's 16th congressional district: Results 1962-1972
! Year
!
! Subject
! Party
! Votes
! %
!
! Opponent
! Party
! Votes
! %
|-

|1962
||
| |B. F. Sisk (inc.)
| |Democratic
| |108,339
| |71.87
||
| |Arthur L. Selland
| |Republican
| |42,401
| |28.13
|-
|1964
||
| |B. F. Sisk (inc.)
| |Democratic
| |117,727
| |66.77
||
| |David T. "Dave" Harris		
| |Republican
| |58,604
| |33.24
|-
|1966
||
| |B. F. Sisk (inc.)
| |Democratic
| |118,063
| |71.38
||
| |Cecil F. White	
| |Republican
| |47,329
| |28.62
|-
|1968
||
| |B. F. Sisk (inc.)
| |Democratic
| |97,476
| |62.46
||
| |David T. "Dave" Harris			
| |Republican
| |55,188
| |35.36
|-
|1970
||
| |B. F. Sisk (inc.)
| |Democratic
| |95,118
| |66.42
||
| |Phillip V. Sanchez	
| |Republican
| |43,843
| |30.62
|-
|1972
||
| |B. F. Sisk (inc.)
| |Democratic
| |134,132
| |79.13
||
| |Carol Harner		
| |Republican
| |35,385
| |20.87

|+ California's 15th congressional district: Results 1974-1976
! Year
!
! Subject
! Party
! Votes
! %
!
! Opponent
! Party
! Votes
! %
|-

|1974
||
| |B. F. Sisk (inc.)
| |Democratic
| |80,897
| |72.01
||
| |Carol Harner		
| |Republican
| |31,439
| |27.99
|-
|1976
||
| |B. F. Sisk (inc.)
| |Democratic
| |92,735
| |72.20
||
| |Carol Harner			
| |Republican
| |35,700
| |27.80

References

External links

Democratic Party members of the United States House of Representatives from California
20th-century American politicians
History of the San Joaquin Valley
1910 births
1995 deaths